Miodownik, or chonek łejkech (German: Honig), is a dessert cake which, together with the cuker łejkech, serves as a popular wedding cake in Jewish cuisine.

Chonek łejkech is prepared similarly to sponge cake, which is topped with honey that is melted and then cooled down along with other sugar ingredients. Once the mass of prepared dough is poured onto a baking sheet, it is baked at a temperature of 200°C for around 40 minutes.

The recipe for miodownik originates from Galicia and Central Poland.

See also
List of Polish dishes
Medivnyk
Medovik

References

Polish desserts
Polish cuisine
Ashkenazi Jewish cuisine
Honey cakes